Paraxylotoles setipennis is a species of beetles in the family Cerambycidae, and the only species in the genus Paraxylotoles. It was described by Breuning in 1973.

References

Dorcadiini
Monotypic Cerambycidae genera